Martin Butler may refer to:
Martin Butler (footballer, born 1974), English footballer
Martin Butler (footballer, born 1966), English footballer
Martin Butler (composer) (born 1960), English musician and composer
Martin Butler (director), Australian director and producer